The FAI Cup 1934/35 was the fourteenth edition of Ireland's premier cup competition, The Football Association of Ireland Challenge Cup or FAI Cup. The tournament began on 13 January 1935 and concluded on 14 April with the final held at Dalymount Park, Dublin. An official attendance of 22,000 people watched Bohemians defeat Dundalk in a high-scoring finale.

First round

Second round

Semi-finals

Replay

Final

Notes
A.  From 1923-1936, the FAI Cup was known as the Free State Cup.

B.  Attendances were calculated using gate receipts which limited their accuracy as a large proportion of people, particularly children, attended football matches in Ireland throughout the 20th century for free by a number of means.

References
General

External links
FAI Website

1934-35
1934–35 in Irish association football
FAI Cup